The Fool is a 1925 American silent drama film directed  by Harry Millarde. It is based on the 1922 play The Fool by Channing Pollock.

Plot
As described in a film magazine review, the Rector of a wealthy church loses the sympathy and support of parishioners when he preaches the doctrine of Christ to sacrifice worldly goods. He establishes a mission among the lower classes and, although he is beaten for his efforts, he gains happiness by doing good.

Cast

Preservation
With no prints of The Fool located in any film archives, it is a lost film.

See also
1937 Fox vault fire

References

External links

1925 films
Lost American films
American films based on plays
Films directed by Harry F. Millarde
Fox Film films
American silent feature films
American black-and-white films
Silent American drama films
1925 drama films
1925 lost films
Lost drama films
1920s American films